Prince Wind Farm is a large wind farm in northern Ontario.  Prince Wind Farm is owned by Brookfield Power Prince Wind LP, a subsidiary of Brookfield Power. It is located north of Sault Ste. Marie, Ontario, mostly within the township of Prince but also extending into Unorganized Algoma (Dennis and Pennefather Townships), however it is visible from as far away as Pancake Bay Provincial Park and Whitefish Point. Prince I, 99 MW was completed in September 2006, Prince II, 90 MW, in November 2006. The average capacity factor for the first five full years of operation was 27.2%.

Description 
Prince Wind Farm has a footprint of 300 hectares and the total area is over 10,000 hectares.

Main components of the Prince Wind farm: 
 126 GE SLE 1.5 MW wind turbines  
 90 kilometers of underground collector cables. 
 11.2 kilometers of above ground transmission line
 two electrical substations that step-up the voltage for the grid to 230 kV (Prince 1 TS, Prince 2 TS). 
 One Switching Station (Heyden SS), for interconnection into the Great Lake Power Transmission system. 
 50 kilometers of access roads. 
 Meteorological towers, used for weather data acquisition. Unlike modern wind farms in Ontario, Prince Wind Farm does not provide met data to the Independent Electricity System Operator(IESO) from its met towers.
 An operations and maintenance building located in west Sault Ste. Marie. 
Prince Wind Farm has secured 30 land owner agreements with private land owners and 20 turbines are located on crown land.

Development 
Early development for Prince Wind Farm began in 2000, when Brookfield started the environmental assessment process, wind data collection and lease negotiations.  Prince Wind Farm was the first wind farm that Brookfield Renewable Power developed and constructed.

Phase I construction begun in September 2005 and achieved commercial operation on September 21, 2006. Phase II begun in January 2006 and achieved commercial operation on November 19, 2006.

See also

List of offshore wind farms

References

External links

 Independent Electricity System Operator (IESO) website
Power Being Generated in Ontario by Site

Wind farms in Ontario
Buildings and structures in Algoma District